Jay Turner-Cooke (born 31 December 2003) is an English professional footballer who plays as a midfielder for Tranmere Rovers, on loan from Newcastle United.

Career
Turner-Cooke began his career with Sunderland, moving to Newcastle United in January 2021. He spent time training with the Newcastle first-team.

Turner-Cooke moved on loan to Tranmere Rovers in January 2023. He also signed a new contract with Newcastle.

Personal life
His father is former player John Cooke, who was later Sunderland's kit man.

References

2003 births
Living people
English footballers
Association football midfielders
English Football League players
Sunderland A.F.C. players
Newcastle United F.C. players
Tranmere Rovers F.C. players